American Idol Season 9 is a compilation album and contains one cover song from each of the top ten finalists during the ninth season of the television show American Idol and was released on May 11, 2010. It debuted at number 77 on the Billboard 200.

Track listing

References

American Idol compilation series
2010 compilation albums
2010 soundtrack albums